Charles Nutting may refer to:

Charles Cleveland Nutting (1858–1927), American zoologist
Charles William Nutting (1889–1964), British air marshal

See also
Nutting (disambiguation)